Lock Upp is the first season of Indian reality competition television series, Lock Upp: Badass Jail, Atyaachari Khel!. Hosted by Kangana Ranaut and Karan Kundrra, it premiered on ALTBalaji and MX Player from 27 February 2022. The Grand Finale or Badass Finale of the show was held on 7 May 2022 where Munawar Faruqui emerged as the winner while Payal Rohatgi was announced as the Runner-up.

Concept
Nineteen contestants called Inmates who were accused in the outside world fought it out in jail to earn every basic necessity and win the heart of the host Kangana Ranaut and audience by performing tasks and showcasing their personalities. Karan Kundrra was introduced as Jailor for the entire season. Tejasswi Prakash entered as the Warden for the final lockout and grand finale. After 70 days, the contestant with the highest votes walks away with freedom and the trophy of Lock Upp: Badass Jail, Atyaachari Khel!.

Production and marketing
On 2 February 2022, Ekta Kapoor teased the show on her social media handles. Kapoor described the show as the biggest and the most fearless reality show. On 3 February 2022, In a press conference Kapoor revealed the title of the show, Lock Upp: Badass Jail, Atyaachari Khel! and the host, Kangana Ranaut. On 10 February 2022, Kapoor unveiled the premiere date 27 February 2022. On 11 February 2022, the teaser and on 16 February 2022, the trailer was released both featuring Ranaut. Five contestants were revealed before the premiere of the show; In chronological order they are, Nisha Rawal, Munawar Faruqui, Poonam Pandey, Babita Phogat, and Karanvir Bohra.

Viewership
On 2 March 2022, It was reported that the show garnered 15 million views within 48 hours of its release. On 19 March 2022, the show crossed 100 million views within 19 days of its release, becoming one of the most-watched reality shows on a OTT platform. On 31 March 2022, the show surpassed 200 million views. On 16 April 2022, the show surpassed 300 million views.

Inmates status

 Male
 Female
 Transgender

Inmates
 Participants in the order of appearance and entering the jail.

Original entrants 
 Munawar Faruqui – Stand-up comedian. 
Charge - Allegations of mocking hinduism at his show. He unintentionally or intentionally mocked hindu deity Ram & Sita in a bollywood song. Also making controversial dark jokes in his comedy show about various events of religious extrimism.
 Chakrapani – Self-proclaimed Swami.
Charge - He has gained media attention for his for his 'gomutra party' during the initial days of the coronavirus pandemic, Also for his purchase of wanted criminal Dawood Ibrahim's properties at auctions and his attempts to convert them into public toilets.
 Saisha Shinde – Fashion designer. 
Charge -  
 Poonam Pandey – Actress and model. Known for her posting revealing pictures and videos on social media.
Charge - Involvement in the porn film racketing controversy scandal.
 Babita Phogat – Wrestler. 
Charge - She entered politics by joining the 'Bharatiya Janata Party' in 2019 and claimed that 'Tablighi Jamaat' is a bigger problem than COVID-19.
 Sara Khan – Actress. 
Charge - Married Ali Merchant on the Bigg Boss 4, then divorced within a few months.
 Shivam Sharma –  Actor and Entrepreneur.
Charge - Scallywag and flirty nature.
 Sidharth Sharma – Actor
Charge - He was in news after conflicts and jealousy with co-actors.
 Anjali Arora – Social media influencer. 
Charge -accused for posting non-influencing content.  
 Nisha Rawal – Actress.
Charge - Controversial fights.Nisha filed a police complaint against her then-husband, actor Karan Mehra, accusing him of physical assault and an extramarital affair.
 Tehseen Poonawala – Lawyer and political analyst.
Charge -  
 Payal Rohatgi – Actress and model.
Charge - In October 2019, she made controversial remarks concerning Mahatma Gandhi, Jawaharlal Nehru, Indira Gandhi and Rajiv Gandhi in a video shared on social media. In 2020, her Twitter account was permanently suspended.
 Karanvir Bohra – Actor. 
Charge - Steals the limelight. He participated in ten reality shows but never won.

Wildcard entrants 
 Ali Merchant - Actor, anchor, DJ and music producer. 
Charge - Ex-husband of Sara khan, married for publicity.
 Chetan Hansraj - Actor.
Charge - Known for playing villainous roles.

 Mandana Karimi - Iranian actress and model based in India. 
 Charge - She was accused for creating controversies.

 Azma Fallah -  
Charge - 

 Zeeshan Khan - Actor and model.
Charge - 

 Vinit Kakar - Actor and entrepreneur.
Charge - Dirty player.

Troublemaker

 Prince Narula - Actor And Model. 
Charge- Serial Winner

Twists
The show had various twists that makes it differ from other reality shows such as:
The news segment, where inmates get to know the latest 'hot' news from outside world. 
'Super Khabri', the Lock Upp fan get to meet his/her favorite inmate(s).

Living status

Atyaachaari Arena Tasks

Punishments

Secrets

Temptations

Chargesheet History

Chargesheet Notes
: Saved by 'Judgemental Janta'.
: Saved by inmates.
: Saved him/herself by revealing a secret.
: Nominated by Munawar on day 12, In return of temptations.
: Tehseen saved Saisha by revealing his secret.
: Since Anjali wasn't chosen by block(s) leader last week she received power to save any one inmate. 
: A chargesheet was directly filed against inmate(s) by host Kangana Ranaut.
: During temptations, Mandana got the power to save an inmate by nominating Shivam. Also filing chargesheet against Azma, Karanvir and Payal for next week.
: Mandana walked out from the show following an argument between her and jailor, she Re-entered the same day later.
: Saved by Host Kangana Ranaut.
: Saved by temptations.
: Munawar saved Saisha by revealing his secret.
: Munawar saved himself by winning the Finale Warrant.
: Anjali saved Prince by winning Finale Warrant.
: Soon after the official start of the Grand Finale, Prince was revealed to have just been a troublemaker who had entered the jail just for some time and wouldn't win the trophy.

Guests

Episodes

See also
List of programs broadcast by ALTBalaji

References

External links
 Lock Upp on ALTBalaji
 
 Lock Upp on MX Player

Indian reality television series
Hindi-language television shows
Television shows set in Mumbai
2022 Indian television series debuts
2022 Indian television seasons
ALTBalaji original programming